René-François Dumas, born 14 December 1753 in Jussey, in the bailiwick of Amont (now in Haute-Saône), was a revolutionary French lawyer and politician, regarded as a "Robespierrist", who died on 28 July 1794 (10 Thermidor) at Paris.

Biography
René-François was born of respectable parents, and well educated.  In June 1790  Dumas founded a popular society in Lons-le-Saunier and became a member of the city council. In 1791 he was the mayor of Lons-le-Saunier.

He became member of the "Society of the Friends of the Constitution", where he played a leading role, even occupying the presidency.

On 26 September 1793, Dumas was appointed vice-president of the Revolutionary Tribunal and involved in the trial of Madame Roland, Marie-Antoinette and Madame du Barry.

On 8 April 1794, three days after the execution of Danton and Desmoulins, he became the president of the court, taking over from Martial Joseph Armand Herman, who was appointed Foreign minister. In this quality, with Fouquier-Tinville as the public prosecutor, he headed several major political trials in which defendants were sentenced to death. The trial of the "first conspiracy of the prisons" on 13 April considered in particular the general Arthur Dillon, the archbishop constitutional of Paris Jean-Baptiste Gobel, procureur syndic of the Commune of Paris Pierre Gaspard Chaumette, and the widows Marie Marguerite Françoise Hébert and Lucile Desmoulins.

In June the tribunal put in force the Law of 22 Prairial. According to Adolphe Thiers their goal was to keep the prisons empty. According to Fouquier-Tinville, Dumas and Coffinhal, the vice-president of the tribunal, went each morning to see Robespierre and did what he told them to do, not what the Committee of Public Safety had decided. His last victim was the Princess of Monaco on 28 July. At four o'clock in the afternoon a charge of 45 convicts was sent to the guillotine on the Place de la Nation, but was stopped on the way in the Faubourg Saint-Antoine. Francois Henriot, general of the Parisian National Guard, accompanied the procession.

In the evening of 9 Thermidor Dumas joined the insurrectionary Commune of Paris to obtain the release of Maximilien de Robespierre, Louis Antoine de Saint-Just, Couthon, Philippe-François-Joseph Le Bas and Augustin Robespierre. In the morning of 10 Thermidor the whole group was arrested in the "Hôtel de Ville", taken to the Conciergerie and tried. Fouquier-Tinville, who was considered to be biased, was replaced. In the early evening the group was guillotined on the Place du Révolution.

References

Further reading
 THE PUBLIC PROSECUTOR : : OF THE TERROR : : ANTOINE QUENTIN FOUQUIER-TINVILLE TRANSLATED FROM THE FRENCH OF ALPHONSE J. DUNOYER BY A.W. EVANS WITH A PHOTOGRAVURE FRONTISPIECE AND FOURTEEN OTHER ILLUSTRATIONS

Presidents of the French Revolutionary Tribunal
1753 births
1794 deaths
French people executed by guillotine during the French Revolution
Prosecutors
Jacobins
People of the Reign of Terror
18th-century French lawyers